Blanche McIntosh was a British screenwriter of the silent era. She worked for Cecil M. Hepworth's Hepworth Pictures, and was employed on films such as The American Heiress (1917).

Selected filmography
 The Vicar of Wakefield (1913)
 The Heart of Midlothian (1914)
 The Nightbirds of London (1915)
 Trelawny of the Wells (1916)
 The American Heiress (1917)
 Sheba (1919)
 Mrs. Erricker's Reputation (1920)
 Anna the Adventuress (1920)
 The Tinted Venus (1921)
 Mr. Justice Raffles (1921)

References

Bibliography
 Wintour, Barry. Britain and the Great War, 1914-1918: A Subject Bibliography of Some Selected Aspects. Greenengle publishing, 2014.

External links

Year of birth unknown
Year of death unknown
British women screenwriters